Missile Row was a nickname given in the 1960s to the United States Space Force and NASA launch complexes at Cape Canaveral Space Force Station (CCSFS). Operated by the 45th Space Wing since 1949, it was the site of all pre-Apollo 8 manned launches, as well as many other early Department of Defense (DoD) and NASA launches. For the DoD, it plays a secondary role to Vandenberg AFB in California, but is the launch site for many NASA unmanned space probes, as those spacecraft are typically launched on United States Space Force launchers. Active launch vehicles are in bold.

Much of the support activity for Cape Canaveral Space Force Station occurs at Patrick Space Force Base to the south, its reporting base.

Inactive sites

Active sites
Some of the launch complexes have been recommissioned for modern space vehicle launches.

Other

References

External links
Encyclopedia Astronautica, Cape Canaveral entry
Launch sites
Rocket launch sites in the United States
Spaceports in the United States
Technology-related lists
Space lists
Lists of buildings and structures in Florida
1950 establishments in Florida